The Railway Bridge is a bridge that crosses the Daugava river in Riga, the capital of Latvia. 

The first iron railway bridge in Riga, over 600 ftm long, was erected in 1871–1872 for the Riga–Jelgava Railway.

The new bridge was inaugurated 1914, shelled twice, during World War I in 1917 and World War II in 1944, and was rebuilt both times. The bridge is nowadays the only railway bridge in Riga.

The bridge will be duplicated as part of the new Rail Baltica line through Riga.

References 

Bridges in Riga
Crossings of the Daugava River
Railway bridges in Latvia
Bridges completed in 1955